A crescent is a shape symbolising the Moon.

Crescent may also refer to:

Animals
 Crescent butterflies, brush-footed butterflies of the genera Anthanassa and Phyciodes
 Crescent pigeon, a breed of domestic pigeon

Brands and enterprises
 Crescent (brand), a brand of tools after which the Crescent wrench takes its name
 Crescent, a Swedish bicycle brand manufactured by Nymanbolagen (later Monark-Crescentbolagen)
 Crescent Arms, a firearms manufacturer bought by Savage Arms
 Crescent Capital Group, a private American investment firm
 Crescent Enterprises, a conglomerate based in the United Arab Emirates
 Crescent Foods, a Seattle, Washington, spice and flavorings company (1889-1983)
 Crescent Petroleum, a privately owned company headquartered in the United Arab Emirates
 Crescent Toys, a British toy manufacturer from 1922 to 1980

Music
 Crescent (band), an alternative band from Bristol, UK
 Crescent (Egyptian band), a metal band from Egypt
 Crescent (John Coltrane album), a 1964 album
 Crescent, a 2003 album by Japanese pop/rock artist Gackt
 "Crescent", a song by Animals as Leaders from the album The Joy of Motion, 2014
 Crescent Records, a record label
 The Crescents, an Australian vocal harmony group, active from 1958 to 1962
 The Crescents, an American rock and roll band, with guitarist Thom Bresh

People 

 Guy Crescent (1920–1996), French businessman
 Guy-Crescent Fagon (1638–1718), French physician and botanist

Places

Antarctica
 Crescent Bay, Victoria Land
 Crescent Glacier (Antarctica), Victoria Land
 Crescent Scarp, Palmer Land
 Crescent Stream, Victoria Land

Canada
 Crescent Falls, two falls in Alberta, Canada
 Crescent Street, a Montreal street famous for its nightlife
 Crescent Town, Toronto, a neighbourhood in Toronto, Ontario

Europe
 Crescent (Occitania), an Occitan dialectal zone
 Crescent Shopping Centre, a shopping mall in Limerick, Ireland
 The Crescent, Limerick, Georgian period development in Limerick, Ireland
 The Crescent, Wisbech, a Georgian period development in Wisbech, England.

United States
 Crescent, California, a region in Plumas County
 Crescent, Georgia, an unincorporated community
 Crescent, Idaho, an unincorporated community
 Crescent, Iowa, a city
 Crescent, New York, a hamlet
 Crescent Bridge, over the Mohawk River
 Crescent, North Carolina, an unincorporated community
 Crescent, Ohio, an unincorporated community
 Crescent, Oklahoma, a city
 Crescent, Oregon, an unincorporated community
 Crescent, South Carolina, an unincorporated community
 Crescent, Utah, a city
 Crescent, Wisconsin, a town
 Crescent, Chippewa County, Wisconsin, an unincorporated community
 Crescent City (disambiguation)
 Crescent Glacier (Alaska)
 Crescent Glacier (Mount Adams), Washington
 Crescent Plantation, Tallulah, Louisiana
 Crescent Range, within the White Mountains of New Hampshire
 Mount Crescent, a summit in the Crescent Range
 Crescent River (Georgia)
 Crescent Township (disambiguation)
 Crescent Township, Allegheny County, Pennsylvania

Vietnam
 Crescent Mall in Ho Chi Minh City

Elsewhere
 Crescent Beach (disambiguation)
 Crescent Island (disambiguation)
 Crescent Lake (disambiguation), including North American lakes
 Crescent Nebula, in the constellation Cygnus
 Fertile Crescent, a region comprising areas currently part of Iraq, Kuwait, Syria, Lebanon, Jordan, Israel, Cyprus, Egypt, Turkey and Iran

Schools
 Crescent College, Jesuit college based in Limerick, Ireland
 Crescent Engineering College, a private engineering college in Vandalur, Chennai (Madras), India
 Crescent Girls' School, an all-girls' secondary school in Singapore
 Crescent School (disambiguation)

Sports
 Cincinnati Crescents, an All-Star barnstorming baseball team that played in the mid-1940s
 Crescent Arena, Saskatoon, Saskatchewan, an indoor arena
 Crescent Boat Club, Philadelphia, Pennsylvania
 Crescent Hockey Club, a field hockey club in Pakistan
 Halifax Crescents, an early amateur, later professional, ice hockey team in Halifax, Canada, from 1899 to 1948
 Old Crescent, Limerick City based rugby club
 Paterson Crescents, a defunct basketball team based in Paterson, New Jersey

Transportation
 Crescent (train), an American passenger train running between New York City and New Orleans
 Crescent Air Cargo, an all-cargo airline based in Chennai, Tamil Nadu, India
 Crescent Shipyard, former shipyard in Elizabeth, New Jersey
 HMCS Crescent, a World War II Royal Canadian Navy destroyer
 HMS Crescent, 11 Royal Navy ship

Other uses
 Crescent - a non-straight street
 Crescent (architecture), an architectural structure comprising a number of houses laid out in an arc to form a crescent shape
 Crescent (novel), a 2003 novel by Diana Abu-Jaber
 Crescent (Pictish symbol)
 Crescent (solitaire), a card game
 Crescent Arts Centre in Belfast (Northern Ireland)
 Crescent Dragonwagon, an American writer
 Crescent meteorite of 1936, which fell in Oklahoma, United States (see meteorite falls)
 Crescent rolls, a type of puff pastry

See also

 
 Crescent moon (disambiguation)
 La Crescent (disambiguation)
 The Crescent (disambiguation)